Placid is a masculine given name, and may refer to:

 John Placid Adelham (17th century), English Protestant minister
 Saint Placid (6th century), Italian Christian monk
 Placid J. Podipara (20th century), Indian Catholic priest

See also
 Placid, Texas, a community in the United States
 Lake Placid (disambiguation)

Masculine given names